The Duesenberg Model A was the first automobile in series production to have hydraulic brakes and the first automobile in series production in the United States with a straight-eight engine. Officially known as the Duesenberg Straight Eight, the Model A was first shown in late 1920 in New York City. Production was delayed by substantial changes to the design of the car, including a change in the engine valvetrain from horizontal overhead valves to an overhead camshaft; also during this time, the company had moved its headquarters and factory from New Jersey to Indiana. The Model A was manufactured in Indianapolis, Indiana, from 1921 to 1925 by the Duesenberg Automobiles and Motors Company and from 1925 to 1926 at the same factory by the restructured Duesenberg Motor Company. The successors to the company began referring to the car as the Model A when the Model J was introduced. With a top speed of 71mph.

Background
Fred and August Duesenberg built aircraft and marine engines during World War I and used this expertise to design and build racing engines and to design a car. The Duesenberg Automobiles and Motors Company was incorporated in Delaware and founded to manufacture and market the production car while Duesenberg Brothers, a separate organization, built racing cars and engines.

Introduction and delay
The Duesenberg Straight Eight was introduced in late 1920 at the Commodore Hotel in New York City, but production of the Straight Eight did not begin until late 1921.  The main reason for the delay was Fred Duesenberg's decision to redesign several aspects of the car, including the valvetrain. The headquarters and manufacturing facilities of the Duesenberg Automobiles and Motors Company were relocated from Newark, New Jersey, to Indianapolis, Indiana during this time. The move was completed in May 1921, but the redesign was not.

Design and engineering

Drivetrain
The Straight Eight was the first car in series production in the United States with a straight-eight engine. The engine had a cast iron block, a detachable cast iron cylinder head, and an aluminum lower crankcase and oil pan. The crankshaft ran in three main bearings. While the prototype Straight Eight shown at the model's introduction had horizontal valves of the type used in earlier Duesenberg-designed marine and racing engines, the model that entered production had a shaft-driven single overhead camshaft which used rockers to operate two valves per cylinder in a hemispheric combustion chamber.

The engine used a single updraft carburetor; early versions used a Stromberg unit, which was replaced by a Schebler unit. The carburetor was on the right side of the engine, the mixture went into a passage through the engine block to the intake manifold on the left side of the engine. Ignition was by Delco coil and breaker points, with the distributor at the end of the generator/starter unit.

A single dry-plate clutch and an unsynchronized three-speed gearbox were bolted to the engine.  The gearbox was operated directly with a central shift lever. The drive shaft was enclosed in a torque tube and drove the live rear axle through a spiral bevel drive.

Chassis
The chassis was based on a pressed steel ladder frame with channel-section side members and fabricated and tubular cross members. Suspension was by semi-elliptic leaf springs and Watson Stabilator dampers front and rear, with a tubular beam axle at the front and a live axle and radius rods at the rear. Center-locking wire wheels with 5" x 33" tires were used front and rear.

The Duesenberg Straight Eight was the first production automobile to use Lockheed Corporation Hydraulic brakes on all four wheels. The fluid used in the system was a mixture of glycerine and water.

Reception

The initial production target was 100 cars per month. By the end of 1922, after slightly more than a year of production, fewer than 150 Duesenberg Straight Eights had been built. Production of the Straight Eight continued through several changes in management, placement of the Duesenberg Automobiles and Motors Company into receivership in January 1924, and the restructuring of the company into the Duesenberg Motor Company in February 1925, until the purchase of the company by E. L. Cord in October 1926. About 650 Straight Eights had been built when Cord ended production in 1926.

Legacy

The Duesenberg Model X, a derivative of the Straight Eight, had a short production run in 1927. About twelve were built. The Model X had an engine with the same bore and stroke as the Straight Eight but with a non-crossflow head. The engine delivered .

Despite its regional and worldwide automotive firsts, the Straight Eight has been obscured by the later Model J. It is no longer widely known by the Straight Eight name under which it was marketed and sold, having been renamed the "Model A" after the introduction of the Model J.

Notes

References

External links

A
First car made by manufacturer
Cars introduced in 1920